Terradyne Armoured Vehicles Inc. is an armoured car manufacturing company with head offices located in Newmarket, Ontario, Canada.

About the vehicles 
The vehicles that have been developed fall into two main categories. There are vehicles that are lightly armoured, and then stock vehicles that have had armour hidden in their body.  The Light Armour Vehicles (LAVs) are popular among governments, whereas the vehicles that have the hidden armour are more popular for high level civilians or sometimes ambassadors. Although these vehicles use two different styles of armour, they both have been designed and tested to be able to stop a 7.62 mm armour-piercing round.  The LAVs were also designed to be highly mobile, durable and carry a payload whether it is combat-ready troops or equipment.  Their flagship model Gurkha is produced in three configurations, namely; MPV, LAPV and RPV and caters to law enforcement, police and military purposes.

Products

Terradyne Armored Vehicles Gurkha - based on Ford F550 chassis
LAPV (light armoured patrol vehicle)
MPV (multi purpose vehicle)
RPV (rapid patrol vehicle)
CIV (Civilian edition of the RPV)

External links
Terradyne Armoured Vehicles official site

Car manufacturers of Canada
Companies based in Newmarket, Ontario